Padge is both a given name and surname. Notable people with the name include:

Padge Kehoe (1926–2007), Irish hurler
Padge King (fl. 1892), Mayor/King of the Claddagh in Ireland
Michael Paget (born 1978), Welsh musician, singer, songwriter, and guitarist
Willi Padge (born 1943), German rower